The Global Medium Engine (GME for short) is a family of engines created by the powertrain division of Alfa Romeo and in production since 2016.

The GME family is composed by two new series of engine: one created by FCA Italy (codeproject Giorgio) for Alfa Romeo Giulia and Stelvio, and the second (codeproject Hurricane) by FCA US division for American vehicles made by Chrysler, Jeep and Dodge. Both are produced in Termoli, Italy at the Termoli Powertrain Plant.

The first vehicle to use the GME T4 engine is the 2016 Alfa Romeo Giulia introduced in April 2016, followed by the Alfa Romeo Stelvio. The first American Hurricane was adopted by the new Jeep Wrangler (JL) in 2018 followed by the facelift 2019 Jeep Cherokee (KL) and the Chinese Jeep Grand Commander. It is currently available only in 2.0L capacities, with different tunings.

Production

Around 2018, it was rumored production of the Hurricane would move to the Trenton Engine Plant in Trenton, Michigan  which also builds the World Gasoline Engine and the Chrysler Pentastar engine. However, FCA announced on March 5, 2020, it will invest $400 million to repurpose the idled Indiana Transmission Plant II in Kokomo, Indiana, to build the GME for the United States market. Production of the USA-built Hurricane began in 2022.
By June 2018 the GME T4 will also be built in Changsha (China) by GAC Fiat Chrysler Powertrain plant for Chinese made vehicles.

Production Plants

Termoli Powertrain Plant in Termoli, Italy (since 2016 for European and United States markets)
GAC Fiat Chrysler in Changsha, China (since 2018 for Chinese markets)
Kokomo Engine Plant (formerly Indiana Transmission Plant II) in Kokomo, Indiana (since 2022 for United States markets)

Applications

GME T4
2016- Alfa Romeo Giulia (952)
2017- Alfa Romeo Stelvio
2018- Jeep Wrangler (JL)
2018-2023 Jeep Cherokee (KL)
2018- Jeep Grand Commander
2021- Maserati Ghibli Hybrid
2021- Maserati Levante Hybrid
2021- Jeep Wrangler 4xe
2022- Jeep Grand Cherokee (WL)
2022- Jeep Grand Cherokee 4xe (WL)
2022- Maserati Grecale
2023- Alfa Romeo Tonale / Dodge Hornet
2023- Jeep Compass

See also 
 Stellantis Hurricane engine

References

Automobile engines
Hurricane
Fiat Chrysler Automobiles
Straight-four engines
Gasoline engines by model
Stellantis